Pittsburgh International Airport , formerly Greater Pittsburgh International Airport, is a civil–military international airport in Findlay Township and Moon Township, Pennsylvania. Located about 10 miles (15 km) west of downtown Pittsburgh, it is the primary international airport serving the Greater Pittsburgh Region as well as adjacent areas in West Virginia and Ohio. The airport is owned and operated by the Allegheny County Airport Authority and offers passenger flights to destinations throughout North America and Europe.

First opened in 1952, the airport was initially served by five airlines and became a small hub for Trans World Airlines for over two decades. The airport underwent a massive $1 billion rebuilding and expansion which was largely designed to US Airways' specification so it could become one of their major hubs. Completed in 1992, the new airport was one of the most innovative in the world, dubbed the "airport of the future" by the New York Times, and helped to pioneer modern airport design with its X-shape to reduce distance between gates, underground tram to transport passengers around the airport, and array of shopping options, all of which were cutting-edge at the time. Traffic peaked at 20 million passengers in the late 1990s, and US Air peaked at 542 flights and 11,995 employees at the airport in 2001, and the airport was an important pillar of the Pittsburgh economy. However, the downturn in air travel immediately after September 11 attacks badly harmed US Airways' financial state. US Air declared chapter 11 bankruptcy twice in a row, and abandoned Pittsburgh as a hub in 2004, eliminating thousands of jobs and nearly bankrupting the airport itself, which was built largely to suit US Airways' needs. However, US Air's diminished capacity at Pittsburgh opened the door for other airlines to expand operations and better serve local Pittsburgh-area passengers rather than focus on connecting passengers.

The airport experienced a resurgence in the 2010s, doubling the number of carriers to 16 as the Allegheny County Airport Authority has aggressively courted airlines and lobbied for new passenger routes.  Southwest Airlines has increased its presence at the airport in recent years, overtaking American Airlines (which US Airways acquired and merged with) as the largest carrier in terms of passengers. The airport is also a hub for regional carrier Southern Airways Express. Cargo operations have increased at the airport in recent years.

In 2017, the airport became the first in the country to reopen access to the post-security terminal for individuals who are not flying, as long as they can pass through security, after the federal government lifted restrictions put in place after 9/11.

In 2021, the airport became the first in the world with its own microgrid, which provides power to the entire airport with natural gas and solar power.

The airport is currently undergoing a $1.39 billion renovation which will include a new terminal for check-in, security, and baggage claim adjacent to the gates. The renovation will eliminate the need for the tram and increase the number of parking spaces. Officials emphasized that the renovations would make the airport more suited to Pittsburgh, rather than to US Airways. First announced in 2017 and delayed due to the coronavirus pandemic, the renovation resumed in 2021 and is now projected to open in 2025. The project will not use any local tax dollars, and airlines will pay most of the costs.

History

Early years
Until the beginning of World War II, Moon Township was mostly a rural agricultural area. It was not considered a suburb of downtown Pittsburgh as it was too distant. It was served solely by Pittsburgh-based state and federal services and media. In the early 1920s, John A. Bell of Carnegie purchased a number of small farms in Moon and established a commercial dairy farm on his  of land. He was bought out by E.E. Rieck and his wife, and C.F. Nettrour, owners of the established Rieck's Dairy. They doubled the number of cattle at the farm.

Around 1940, the federal government, through the Works Progress Administration (WPA), determined that the Pittsburgh area needed a military airport to defend the industrial wealth of the area and to provide a training base and stop-over facility. The administration of President Franklin D. Roosevelt was continuing to invest in infrastructure across the country in the waning years of the Great Depression, before the US entered World War II, which had started in 1939. The agricultural expanses of Moon Township were attractive to airport planners in the city. The Civil Aeronautics Administration proposed $2.6 million to the county for a $6 million field in August 1941 ($ and $ present day dollars). The county bought the Bell Farm, and federal agencies began construction of the runways on 20 April 1942, after the US had entered the war.

In 1944, Allegheny County officials proposed to expand the military airport with the addition of a commercial passenger terminal to relieve the Allegheny County Airport, which was built in 1926 and was becoming too small. Ground was broken on the new passenger terminal on 18 July 1946. The new terminal would eventually cost $33 million ($ present day dollars) and was built entirely by Pittsburgh-area companies. The new airport, christened as Greater Pittsburgh Airport (renamed Greater Pittsburgh International Airport in 1972 upon the opening of the International Arrivals Building) opened on 31 May 1952. The first flight was on 3 June 1952. In its first full year of operation in 1953, more than 1.4 million passengers used the terminal. "Greater Pitt" was then considered modern and spacious. The airport terminal was the largest in the United States, second only to Idlewild Airport's (now JFK Airport) in New York when it was completed five years later.  The airport's capacity is one of its most valuable assets.

The airport was designed by local architect Joseph W. Hoover. One of the features of his style is the use of simple, exposed concrete, steel, and glass materials. The terminal building was constructed in "stepped" levels: the first floor extended farther than the second, the second floor extended farther than the third, etc. Such a design meant that the uncovered roof of the lower level could be an observation deck. In addition to the observation decks, the rounded "Horizon Room" was on the fourth floor with a commanding view of the airport. The interior of the terminal building was in the contemporary International Style, as was the exterior. One of the memorable features of the lobby was the large compass laid in the floor with green and yellow-orange terrazzo. A mobile by Alexander Calder was another decorative feature of the lobby. The mobile hangs in the center core of the new airside terminal. A re-creation of the compass was installed in the new terminal at an exhibit dedicated to old "Greater Pitt".

Growth and hub years
The first five airlines of the Greater Pittsburgh Airport were Trans World Airlines (TWA), Capital Airlines (later part of United), Northwest, All American (later Allegheny Airlines, then USAir, and finally US Airways), and Eastern Airlines. The April 1957 Airline Guide shows 58 weekday departures on Capital, 54 TWA, 18 Allegheny, 8 United, 7 Eastern, 4 Northwest, 3 American and 2 Lake Central. The first jets in service at Pittsburgh were TWA 707s on a Los Angeles-Chicago-Pittsburgh loop in summer 1959.

The 1956 diagram shows runway 10/28 7500 ft, 5/23 5766 ft and 14/32 5965 ft. The longest runway was still 7500 ft when jets started in 1959 but was soon extended to 8000 ft. The 10500-ft runway 10L was added by 1965.

In 1959, the east dock was added to the terminal. On 1 July 1968, international airport status was obtained with the dedication of the first customs office at the complex. Ground was broken for the International Wing, west of the original terminal building, in 1970. It opened in 1972 to accommodate federal inspection services; international flights (Nordair 737s to Canada) began in 1971. The airport expanded as load increased. In 1972, rotundas were added to the end of each dock to allow more gates. In the later 1970s growth in regional air travel created a need for more gates. In 1980 the South East Dock was opened. Even with these expansions, the terminal was too small.

From the 1960s to about 1985, TWA operated a small hub at Pittsburgh. The carrier introduced the first nonstop route from the city to Europe, a Lockheed L-1011 service to London, in May 1981. Nevertheless, the flight lasted only four months; TWA stated that too few passengers were traveling in first class, rendering the service unprofitable. In 1985, British Airways announced that it would start operating Boeing 747s to London via Washington, D.C., later that year. Two days before the maiden flight, the airline sent one of its Concordes to Pittsburgh to celebrate the launch of the route.

In 1987, with the financial backing of USAir (then the dominant carrier in Pittsburgh), work commenced on a billion-dollar expansion which was designed by Tasso Katselas Associates, Inc. Three years later, USAir inaugurated a link to Frankfurt, signaling the resumption of nonstop transatlantic service from the airport. The route benefited the various West German companies that had offices in the city. 

On 1 October 1992, the new terminal opened, with operations having been transferred overnight from the old terminal. (The old terminal was kept until 1999 to house remaining operations offices.) The new terminal had numerous innovative features, including an AirMall, with more than 100 retailers and eateries. The air mall and underground tram were considered cutting-edge. The new landside/airside design construction eliminated the need for connecting passengers to go through security more than once. The airport was equipped to handle up to 35 million passengers per year. The modern and innovative Pittsburgh airport became a model for other airports around the world. Its design simplified aircraft movement on the airfield and enabled easy pedestrian traffic to the gates.

US Air expanded with the new airport, and by 1995 they had nonstops from PIT to 91 airports, plus 28 more on USAir Express. In 1997 the airport handled almost 21 million passengers, more than any previous year. By the late 1990s growth had leveled off, with USAir concentrating on expanding at Philadelphia and Charlotte/Douglas International Airport, which had been a hub airport of Piedmont Airlines. 

In August 2001, the airport had its busiest month ever with 2 million passengers and an average of 633 daily flights, and was on track for 2001 to be its busiest year ever. Then the September 11 attacks harmed the aviation industry, and US Air in particular, setting in motion the decline of Pittsburgh as a hub. US Air began slashing jobs a week after the attacks and filed for chapter 11 bankruptcy reorganization in 2002. High operating costs at the airport put the US Airways hub in Pittsburgh at a serious disadvantage. By 2003, US Airways reported to be running a $40 million loss per year ($ present day dollars) operating its hub at Pittsburgh, while also paying roughly 80% of the new airport's $673 million debt ($ present day dollars) stemming from its requested construction of the new terminals.

Just before emerging from bankruptcy in 2003, US Air canceled its leases at Pittsburgh without any notice to airport and county officials, a move that former Allegheny County Airport Authority executive director said was "completely immoral and unethical" in a 2021 interview. US Air filed for bankruptcy again in September 2004. Two months later, the carrier ceased service to London and Frankfurt, leaving the airport without any flights to Europe. After failed negotiations to lower landing fees and debt obligations, the airline announced in December 2004 that it would be reducing operations at Pittsburgh, shifting hub operations to Charlotte and Philadelphia. By the end of 2005 the airline had eliminated 7,000 jobs while operating roughly 200 flights per day, mostly domestic. A year later, US Airways had only about 170 flights per day to and from Pittsburgh, most being domestic flights. Unrelenting flight and job cuts continued through the decade; accompanied by the airline's closure of Concourse E on the Landside Terminal and a portion of Concourse A on the Airside Terminal. In 2007, US Air's market share in Pittsburgh dropped below 40% for the first time since the airport's expansion in 1992. By the end of the decade, US Airways had reduced to 68 flights per day, operating from ten gates on Concourse B, and one US Airways Club location. Numerous US Airways ticketing and customer service counters were abandoned, and 15 gates on Concourse A and B were sealed off from the rest of the airport. Pittsburgh's air traffic bottomed out in 2013 with 7.8 million passengers and 36 destinations.

Despite de-hubbing the airport, US Airways chose Pittsburgh in 2008 for their systemwide flight operations control center, after a bidding war with Charlotte and Phoenix led to state and local subsidies totaling $16.25 million being offered to US Air to build the center at Pittsburgh. The center worked on emergency operations for US Airways Flight 1549 after it landed in the Hudson River. The airline closed the center in 2015 as part of its merger with American Airlines. (The center was rebuilt as a 9-1-1 center for Allegheny County, which opened in 2019.)

Using Boeing 757s, Delta Air Lines commenced a direct route to Paris in June 2009.

Recent years

Since the wind down of US Airways hub at Pittsburgh, new low cost carriers have been able to enter the market, creating more choices for local passengers. Pittsburgh has also been successful in attracting airlines to serve the region for the first time or to return to the market. Allegiant Air commenced service in February 2015 and established a base of operations later that year. Frontier Airlines re-entered the Pittsburgh airport in 2016 after a four-year absence. Spirit Airlines commenced service to seven destinations in 2017. Alaska Airlines began service in 2019 with a nonstop route to Seattle/Tacoma. In July 2021, Breeze Airways began nonstop service to four cities and has since expanded to 10 destinations. In October 2021, Sun Country Airlines announced it would enter the Pittsburgh market with service to its hub at Minneapolis/St. Paul.

Starting in September 2017, non-ticketed persons were allowed to access the airside terminal and gates, similar to pre-9/11 policy. Pittsburgh was the first airport (since 9/11) in the nation to allow non-passengers to pass through security to dine and shop in a post-security terminal. Participants can sign up for myPITpass on the airport's website and must pass through the alternate security checkpoint before continuing through to the Airmall in the airside terminal. The airport became one of the first in the United States to use a new TSA system called Credential Authentication Technology, which phases out the use of boarding passes at TSA security checkpoints in favor of a stronger system that verifies passengers based solely on a government-issued ID.

In 2017, Pittsburgh was the first U.S. airport to be named Airport of the Year by Air Transport World.

During the winter of 2020–2021, both British Airways and the German airline Condor indefinitely suspended their flights to Pittsburgh. As a result, the airport once more lacked a nonstop connection to Europe. British Airways ultimately resumed its route to Heathrow Airport in June 2022.

Future
In September 2017, Allegheny County Airport Authority officials announced a $1.1 billion plan to renovate and reconfigure the terminal complex, including a new landside terminal and a new parking garage. Under the proposal, the current landside building would be demolished if another use is not found, and the number of gates would be reduced from 75 to 51. A new landside building would be constructed between the airside terminal's concourses C and D, with new security and baggage facilities, a new international arrivals area, and many other amenities to serve passengers. The board chairman of the Airport Authority, David Minnotte, said that "The people of Pittsburgh finally get an airport built for them and not USAir". No taxpayer dollars would be used to construct the new facility, and it will be instead financed with floating bonds, grants, passenger facility charges, and revenue from natural gas drilling on airport property. 

Construction was originally expected to begin in summer 2020 and the new terminal was slated to open in 2023. However, in April 2020 airport officials decided to delay the selling of bonds and start of construction due to the coronavirus pandemic. In February 2021, airport officials announced early site and construction work would begin in spring 2021 with an increased budget of $1.39 billion. The airlines serving the airport agreed to fund $182 million in construction site preparation work for the project. Construction finally began in July 2021 and the project is expected to be completed in 2025.

Facilities

Runways
PIT has a wide, open layout and four runways: three east–west parallel runways and a fourth crosswind runway. Because of the development of non-aviation related business on airport land, PIT can add only one more runway (this number was as high as four in the past). With three parallel runways, simultaneous landings and/or departures can be performed in nearly any situation.

Runways 10L and 10R have Category III ILS (Instrument Landing System) approaches. Runway 28R is certified for Category I ILS and is authorized for Category II approaches but requires special aircrew and aircraft certification. Runways 28L and 32 have Category I ILS approaches. All runways have GPS approaches as well.

Terminal

The airport complex consists of two main buildings, the "Landside Terminal" and the "Airside Terminal". The terminal consists of 75 gates on four concourses; however, only 56 gates are available for use. After passing through the security checkpoint, passengers board one of two underground people movers that travel to the Airside Terminal, where all departure gates are located. All international arrivals, except for cities with United States border preclearance, pass through Concourse C. American Airlines has an Admirals Club on the mezzanine level of the airside terminal. The Club Lounge opened in October 2017 in the C Concourse across from gate C-52 near the center core and was renovated and expanded in 2019. The airport also operates a free lounge for active duty military and veterans in concourse C.

Concourse A contains 25 gates.
Concourse B contains 25 gates.
Concourse C contains 11 gates.
Concourse D contains 14 gates.

There is an AirMall in the airside terminal, operated by Fraport, with numerous retail stores and restaurants. It was one of the first of its kind in an airport and paved the way for similar shopping experiences at other airports. Tenants in the airport are required to charge the same amount as they do at non-airport locations. Before 9/11, anyone could shop in the airport, but it was closed to non-travelers after 9/11. In 2017, the AirMall was reopened to non-travelers who obtained a free access pass from the airport.

Ground transportation
Interstate 70 to the south and Interstate 80 to the north are both less than an hour away. Just beyond Interstates 70 and 80, Interstate 77 to the west and Interstate 68 to the south are within 90 minutes of the airport.

PIT offers on-site parking patrolled by the Allegheny County Police. The local Grant Oliver Corporation ran the parking from the airport's opening in 1952 until the Allegheny County Airport Authority chose to switch to national contractor LAZ Parking, which took over in October 2022 and will also oversee new facilities planned to open in 2024. Grant Oliver offered a GO FAST Pass account to pay for parking electronically via E-ZPass, with billing and other aspects of the system handled by Grant Oliver. When LAZ Parking took over, this was replaced with a reservation-based system. There are regular parking shuttles to the Long Term and Extended lots that can be accessed from the Baggage Claim level of the Landside Terminal. There are four options for parking: Short Term, Long Term, Extended, and Economy. The economy option was added in 2021. The short term garage has 2100 spaces and is attached to the landside terminal via the enclosed moving walkway. The long term section is also connected to the enclosed moving walkway and has 3,100 spaces available. The extended and economy sections have an outdoor walkway that leads to the enclosed moving walkway and have 8,000 spaces available.

Bus service is also available from Downtown Pittsburgh and the city's University District (Oakland) via the Port Authority of Allegheny County's 28X Route. Mountain Line Transit's Grey Line also has service to areas south of Pittsburgh including Waynesburg, Pennsylvania; Morgantown, Fairmont, and Clarksburg, West Virginia. BCTA Transit formerly served locations north and westbound from the airport. The Pittsburgh Light Rail currently does not stop at the airport.

Cargo area
The airport has begun construction on a new 80,000 sq ft cargo facility with 17 loading docks, scheduled to open in 2024.

Cargo traffic has increased considerably in recent years as airport officials have pitched Pittsburgh to cargo carriers as a more efficient alternative to clogged hubs like New York and Chicago. In 2017, Qatar Airways launched twice-weekly cargo service at Pittsburgh, backed by $1.5 million in subsidies. The effort was not very successful at first as Qatar failed to meet tonnage goals, and in December 2019 the route was suspended. However, Qatar resumed the flight in 2020 without any subsidies, and as of 2022 had increased operations to 3-4 flights per week. Several new cargo carriers began service to Pittsburgh in 2020 and 2021, including Cathay Pacific, SpiceXpress, and Amazon Air. In 2021, nearly 250 million pounds of cargo goods touched down at PIT, the largest figure since 2004 and a 30% increase over 2020. 

The world's leading caterer for air and business, LSG SkyChefs, in 2007 chose Pittsburgh as its sole Western Hemisphere manufacturing facility. LSG SkyChefs cited the region's strategic location for air and truck transport to major suppliers and customers, as well as the airport's excellent record in maintaining and expanding capacity.

Microgrid
In 2018, the airport announced plans to construct its own microgrid, using natural gas and solar power as the primary power source for the airport, protecting it from power outages. In 2019, the airport authority awarded Peoples Natural Gas a 20-year contract to build, maintain, and operate the microgrid at no cost to the airport in exchange for the required land and an agreement to purchase the electricity for 20 years. The microgrid was completed in July 2021, making Pittsburgh the first airport in the world to receive its electricity entirely from a microgrid. The microgrid uses natural gas from the Marcellus Shale as well as solar panels. Most of the energy comes from natural gas; the 9,360 solar panels can generate up to 13% of its peak power. In its first year, the microgrid saved the airport an estimated $1 million in energy costs.

Neighborhood 91
In 2019, the airport announced the development of Neighborhood 91, a 195-acre hub for additive manufacturing on airport grounds. It is so named because Pittsburgh has 90 distinct neighborhoods. The development will house a complete end-to-end supply chain allowing products to be manufactured and finished in one place and then shipped around the world from the airport. The site is being developed as part of a partnership with the University of Pittsburgh and will have 1.4 million square feet of manufacturing and office space.

Other facilities
A Hyatt Regency hotel is located onsite and is directly connected to the landside terminal via moving walkway. The hotel also has a ballroom and meeting facilities. As part of a pilot program, hotel guests were allowed access to the post-security shops and restaurants without an airline ticket as long as they could pass through security. In 2017, airport officials opened post-security access to all non-flying persons who could pass through security, including hotel guests. A Sunoco-branded gas station is also located onsite.  Both the hotel and the gas station draw power from the airport's microgrid.

American Airlines still has a maintenance base at Pittsburgh, which dates back to the US Air days and employs 500 people. American Airlines maintains and repairs all its Airbus narrowbody fleet at Pittsburgh. In 2021, it extended its lease at the airport for five years.

Airlines and destinations

Passenger

Cargo

Through the first 11 months of 2021, FedEx accounted for 50% of all cargo traffic at the airport, followed by UPS at 33% and Amazon Air at 5%.

Statistics

Top destinations

Airline market share

Annual traffic

Accidents and incidents

Other events
The airport has been the venue for a number of miscellaneous events. The U.S. Air Force has held several air shows at the airport.

In 1991, over 40,000 people packed the airport to greet the Pittsburgh Penguins when they landed at the airport after winning their first Stanley Cup championship.

See also

 History of aviation in Pittsburgh

References

External links

 FlyPittsburgh.com official site
 PennDOT Bureau of Aviation: Pittsburgh International Airport
 Airmall
 

 
Airports in Pennsylvania
Transportation in Pittsburgh
Airfields of the United States Army Air Forces Technical Service Command
Airfields of the United States Army Air Forces in Pennsylvania
Works Progress Administration in Pennsylvania
Transportation buildings and structures in Allegheny County, Pennsylvania
Airports established in 1952
Articles containing video clips
1952 establishments in Pennsylvania